"Only Time" is a song by Irish musician Enya. It was released in November 2000 as the lead single from her fifth studio album, A Day Without Rain (2000). The song reached number one in Canada, Germany, Poland and Switzerland, number two in Austria, and became Enya's only top-10 single as a solo artist in the United States, peaking at number 10 on the Billboard Hot 100.

Release
In 2001, "Only Time" was released again as a radio remix. The track was remixed and mastered by the Swiss American Federation (S.A.F. aka Christian B. and Marc Dold) with a final mix by Enya's producer, Nicky Ryan. Enya donated the earnings from the sale of that single to the Widows' and Children's Fund of the Uniformed Firefighters Association to help the families of firefighters in the aftermath of the September 11 attacks. Following the attacks, sales of the album and its lead single, "Only Time", skyrocketed after it was used by several radio and television networks in their coverage and aftermath of the attacks. As a result, "Only Time" climbed to number ten on the Billboard Hot 100 singles chart and number one on the adult contemporary chart. In 2002, the song received an ECHO Award for Best Single.

Music video
The song's music video, which shows Enya performing the song in a spring, summer, fall and winter theme, was directed by Graham Fink. It was released in 2000. In March 2020, to celebrate the 20th anniversary of the recording, the video was remastered in 4K.

Live performances
Enya performed "Only Time" several times, performances included Larry King Live, Children in Need, This Morning, The View, Happy Xmas Show, Entertainment Tonight, Live! with Regis and Kelly, The Tonight Show with Jay Leno and 2001 World Music Awards.

Track listings

UK CD and cassette single (2000)
 "Only Time"
 "The First of Autumn"
 "The Promise"

German CD single (2000)
 "Only Time"
 "The First of Autumn"Remix CD single (2001) "Only Time" (remix)
 "Oíche Chiúin (Silent Night)"
 "Willows on the Water"
 "Only Time" (original version)European CD single (2001) "Only Time" (remix) – 3:14
 "Only Time" (original version) – 3:38US CD single (2001) "Only Time" (remix) – 3:13
 "Oíche Chiúin (Silent Night)" – 3:45
 "Willows on the Water" – 3:02US 7-inch single (2001)A. "Only Time" (remix) – 3:13
B. "May It Be" (edit) – 3:30

Credits and personnel
Credits are lifted from the A Day Without Rain album booklet.Studio Recorded at Aigle Studio (Dún Laoghaire, Ireland)
 Mastered at 360 Mastering (London, England)Personnel' Enya – composition, all instruments and voices, arrangement, mixing
 Roma Ryan – lyrics
 Wired Strings – additional strings
 Nicky Ryan – production, arrangement, mixing, engineering
 Dick Beetham – mastering

Charts

Weekly charts

Year-end charts

Decade-end charts

Certifications

Release history

In popular culture
On 13 November 2013, The Epic Split advertisement was launched for the Volvo Trucks Volvo FM range and featured the song and Jean-Claude Van Damme. The success of the ad caused "Only Time" to re-enter the Billboard Hot 100 at number 43, and the UK Singles Chart at number 95. Kraft Foods later used the song in advertisements showing parents relaxing while their kids eat Kraft Macaroni & Cheese.

The song was featured in the 2018 Marvel film Deadpool 2, as well as the 2022 Marvel film Thor: Love and Thunder''. The song is also played in goal reviews of all Dallas Stars home games at the American Airlines Center. The song has been widely used as an internet meme depicting various scenes that end in tragedy.

See also
 List of Billboard Adult Contemporary number ones of 2001

References

External links

2000 singles
2000 songs
2001 singles
Canadian Singles Chart number-one singles
Charity singles following the September 11 attacks
Enya songs
Number-one singles in Germany
Number-one singles in Poland
Number-one singles in Switzerland
Reprise Records singles
Songs with lyrics by Roma Ryan
Songs with music by Enya
Warner Music Group singles
Internet memes introduced in the 2000s